Stanly José del Carmen Cruz (born 20 September 1995) is sprinter from the Dominican Republic. He competed at the 2016 Olympics in the 200 m and 4 × 100 m relay, but failed to reach the finals.

Personal best
Outdoor
100 metres: 10.18 s (wind: +1.6 m/s) –  Medellín, 9 May 2015
200 metres: 20.46 s (wind: +1.9 m/s) –  La Chaux-de-Fonds, 26 June 2016
Indoor
200 metres: 21.03 –  Boston, 13 February 2016

Achievements

1Disqualified in the semifinals

2Did not finish in the semifinals

References

1995 births
Living people
Dominican Republic male sprinters
Pan American Games competitors for the Dominican Republic
Athletes (track and field) at the 2015 Pan American Games
Athletes (track and field) at the 2016 Summer Olympics
Olympic athletes of the Dominican Republic
Central American and Caribbean Games silver medalists for the Dominican Republic
Competitors at the 2014 Central American and Caribbean Games
Competitors at the 2018 Central American and Caribbean Games
Central American and Caribbean Games medalists in athletics
20th-century Dominican Republic people
21st-century Dominican Republic people